John Solomon (22 November 1931 – 20 October 2014) was a croquet player from England. 

Solomon dominated English croquet in the 1950s and 1960s winning the President's Cup nine times (1955, 1957, 1958, 1959, 1962, 1963, 1964, 1968 and 1971), the Open Championship ten times (1953, 1956, 1959, 1961, 1963, 1964, 1965, 1966, 1967 and 1968) and the Men's Championship ten times (1951, 1953, 1958, 1959, 1960, 1962, 1964, 1965, 1971 and 1972).

Solomon also won the New Zealand Open Championship in 1951 and 1963.

Solomon represented England and latterly Great Britain in five MacRobertson Shield tournaments, winning on four occasions.

As an administrator Solomon served on the Council of the Croquet Association between 1952 and 2004, serving as Chairman (1962 to 1964), Vice President (1976 to 1982) and President (1982 to 2004).

In 2006 Solomon was inducted into the World Croquet Federation Hall of Fame.

Career statistics

Major tournament performance timeline

Major Championship Finals: 26 (22 titles, 4 runners-up)

Works
 Croquet (BT Batsford, 1966)

References

External links
The Croquet Records site

1931 births
English croquet players
2014 deaths